Larak (also Romanized as Lārak; also known as Lāţān and Latūn) is a village in Vardanjan Rural District, Ben County, Chaharmahal and Bakhtiari Province, Iran. At the 2006 census, its population was 583, in 157 families. The village is populated by Turkic people.

References 

Populated places in Ben County